Yazid ibn Ahmad was the tenth independent Shah of Shirvan.

Reign
Yazid replaced his brother Muhammad IV. His reign is notable because of Persianization of culture that took place. He continued the expansionist policy of his brother and attacked Gyurzul castle in 999, defeating its Hunnic ruler Abd-ul Barr Anbasah like his brother did before. He made several attempts to invade Derbent but was never successful. He was succeeded by his first son Manuchihr I.

Issue
Yazid II had several children. The most notable are:
 Manuchihr I - Became shah in 1027.
 Prince Anushirvan - Rebelled.
 Ali II - Became shah in 1034.
 Qubad - Became shah in 1043.
 Shamkuya - married to the Hashimid ruler Abd al-Malik ibn Mansur in December 1035.
 Ahmad ibn Yazid - never ruled. Father of Ali III
 Sallar - deposed Ali III in 1050.
 Mamlan ibn Yazid - never ruled. Executed by Shirvanshah Fariburz I.

Rebellion of Anushirvan
While his father was in Gyurzul castle, Prince Anushirvan decided to revolt against his father in capital Shamakhi. Citizens at first supported him but then turned against Prince and called the Shah back to the city. Prince decided to retreat to Gulustan castle but was killed as he fled.

References

10th-century rulers in Asia
11th-century rulers in Asia
1027 deaths